Founders' kin was a hereditary privilege at certain colleges of the University of Oxford whereby preference was given to applicants who were kin of, that is, related to or descended from, the founder or founders of that college. (It also existed at Winchester College, the feeder school for New College.)

Most founders' kin privileges were removed subsequent to the 1850 Royal Commission into the governance of the university.

Further reading 
 G.D. Squibb, Founders' kin: privilege and pedigree (Oxford: Clarendon Press, 1972)
 'Founders' Kin' in Christopher Hibbert (editor), The Encyclopaedia of Oxford (London: Macmillan, 1998), pages 144-145
 Chris Koenig, 

History of the University of Oxford
Terminology of the University of Oxford
University and college admissions